A special election was held in  in July, 1790, to fill the vacancy left by the death of Theodorick Bland (A) on June 1, 1790.

Election results

Giles took his seat December 7, 1790

See also 
 List of special elections to the United States House of Representatives

References 

Virginia 09
Virginia 1790 09
1790 09
Virginia 09
1790 Virginia elections
United States House of Representatives 1790 09